Maurizio Fabrizio (born 16 March 1952) is an Italian composer, conductor, arranger, producer, musician and singer-songwriter.

Life and career 
Born in Milan, after studying at the conservatory in 1969 Fabrizio became a member of the La Scala orchestra as a percussionist under the direction of Claudio Abbado. In 1970 he formed a musical duo with his brother Popi, Maurizio e Fabrizio, recording several singles and entering the main competition at the 21st edition of the Sanremo Music Festival. 

In 1972 he started a long and fruitful collaboration as arranger and producer with Angelo Branduardi, and also began collaborating as composer and  arranger with other artists including Ornella Vanoni, Patty Pravo and Mia Martini. After recording some solo albums between 1975 and 1980, starting from the early 1980s Fabrizio devoted himself to composing, often teaming with lyricist Guido Morra.

His collaborations include Eros Ramazzotti, Renato Zero, Riccardo Fogli, Miguel Bosé, Antonello Venditti, Mina, Giorgia, Toquinho,  Albano Carrisi, Eduardo De Crescenzo, Donatella Rettore, Rossana Casale, Alexia and Mietta.

Fabrizio also composed music for several stage musicals.

Discography 
Albums 
     1970 - Come il vento (as Maurizio e Fabrizio)
     1975 - Azzurri orizzonti 
     1978 - Movimenti nel cielo  
     1979 - Primo   
     1980 - Personaggi 
     2011 - Bella la vita 
     2013 - L'arte dell'incontro (with Katia Astarita)

References

External links 
 
 

 Maurizio Fabrizio at Discogs
 

1952 births
Italian composers
Politicians from Milan
Italian male conductors (music)
Italian music arrangers
Living people
Italian record producers
Italian singer-songwriters
21st-century Italian conductors (music)
21st-century Italian male musicians